Archileptocera is a genus of flies belonging to the family Sphaeroceridae, the lesser dung flies.

Species
A. lutea Marshall, 1998
A. luteonigripes (Duda, 1920)
A. nigra Marshall, 1998

References

 

Sphaeroceridae
Diptera of South America
Taxa named by Oswald Duda
Brachycera genera